The Embassy of Kazakhstan in London is the diplomatic mission of Kazakhstan in the United Kingdom. The embassy was formerly located in South Kensington before moving to its current location on Pall Mall in 2013.

The Embassy of Kazakhstan in London fulfills several functions, some of these include the protection of citizens and rights of the Republic of Kazakhstan in the United Kingdom, development of co-operation of the Republic with the United Kingdom and implementation of Kazakhstan's foreign policy in the UK.

Gallery

References

External links
Official site
Photos of the embassy building

Kazakhstan
Diplomatic missions of Kazakhstan
Kazakhstan–United Kingdom relations
Grade II listed buildings in the City of Westminster
St James's